is a Japanese biochemist whose research into the relationship between fungi and cholesterol biosynthesis led to the development of statin drugs, which are some of the best-selling pharmaceuticals in history.

He received the Japan Prize in 2006, the Lasker-DeBakey Clinical Medical Research Award in 2008, the Canada Gairdner International Award in 2017.

Early life and education
Endo was born on a farm in Northern Japan and had an interest in fungi already at a young age, being an admirer of Alexander Fleming. He obtained a BA at Tohoku University (Faculty of Agriculture) in Sendai in 1957 and a PhD in biochemistry at the same university in 1966.

Career
From 1957 to 1978 he worked as a research fellow at chemical company Sankyo Co.; initially he worked on fungal enzymes for processing fruit juice. Successful discoveries in this field gained him the credit to move to New York City in 1966, and spend two years at the Albert Einstein College of Medicine as a research associate working on cholesterol.

His most important work in the 1970s was on fungal extrolites and their influence on cholesterol synthesis. He hypothesised that fungi used chemicals to ward off parasitic organisms by inhibiting cholesterol synthesis. The cell membranes of fungi contain ergosterol in place of cholesterol, allowing them to produce compounds that inhibit cholesterol. In 1971 he found a culture broth with citrinin had potent inhibitory activity against HMG-CoA reductase and lowered serum cholesterol levels in rats, but research was suspended because of renal toxicity.

Endo studied 6,000 compounds, of which three extrolites from  Penicillium citrinum  mold isolated from a rice sample collected at a grain shop in Kyoto showed an effect. Findings from clinical studies were only reported in 1980.

One of them, mevastatin, was the first member of the statin class of drugs. Soon after, lovastatin, the first commercial statin, was found in the Aspergillus mold. Although mevastatin never became an approved drug, the mevastatin derivative pravastatin did.

In the late 70s Endo moved back to Tokyo and was an associate professor and later a full professor (1986-) at the Tokyo University of Agriculture and Technology between 1979 and 1997. After his official retirement he became the president of Biopharm Research Laboratories.

Recognition 
He was awarded several other prizes during his career:
 Young Investigator Award in agricultural chemistry (Japan), 1966
 Heinrich Wieland Prize for the discovery of the HMG-CoA reductase inhibitors (West Germany), 1987
 Toray Science and Technology Prize (Japan), 1988
 Warren Alpert Foundation Prize (Harvard Medical School, U.S.A), 2000
 Massry Prize from the Keck School of Medicine, University of Southern California in 2006
 Lasker-DeBakey Clinical Medical Research Award, 2008
 Inducted into the National Inventors Hall of Fame, Alexandria, VA 2012 
 Gairdner Foundation International Award, 2017

Apart from the recognition, Endo never derived financial benefit from his discovery, despite the fact that statins are amongst the most widely prescribed medications.  "The millions of people whose lives will be extended through statin therapy owe it all to Akira Endo," according to Michael S. Brown and Joseph Goldstein, who won the Nobel Prize for related work on cholesterol.

See also 
 Aspergillus oryzae 
 Medicinal molds
 Monascus purpureus

References 

Japanese microbiologists
Japanese biochemists
1933 births
Living people
People from Akita Prefecture
Tohoku University alumni
Academic staff of Tohoku University
Academic staff of Hitotsubashi University
Academic staff of Waseda University
Academic staff of Kanazawa University
Academic staff of Tokyo University of Agriculture and Technology
Foreign associates of the National Academy of Sciences
Massry Prize recipients
Recipients of the Lasker-DeBakey Clinical Medical Research Award
Daiichi Sankyo people